Cristian Turcu (born 25 December 1976) is a Romanian former footballer who played as a striker. He scored a goal in the first leg of the 2005 UEFA Intertoto Cup final against Lens.

Honours
CFR Cluj
Divizia B: 2003–04
UEFA Intertoto Cup runner-up: 2005
FC Snagov
Divizia C: 2007–08

Notes

References

External links
Cristian Turcu at Labtof.ro

1976 births
Living people
Romanian footballers
Association football forwards
Liga I players
Liga II players
Liga III players
Faur București players
FC Brașov (1936) players
ACF Gloria Bistrița players
CFR Cluj players
AS Voința Snagov players
Footballers from Bucharest